The Refugees (1893) is a historical novel by British writer Sir Arthur Conan Doyle.

Plot
It revolves around Amory de Catinat, a Huguenot guardsman of Louis XIV, and Amos Green, an American who comes to visit France. Major themes include Louis XIV's marriage to Madame de Maintenon, retirement from court of Madame de Montespan, the revoking of the Edict of Nantes  (1685) and the subsequent emigration of the Huguenot de Catinats to America.

References

External links

1893 British novels
Novels by Arthur Conan Doyle
British historical novels
Novels set in the 1680s
Novels set in France
Harper & Brothers books
Huguenot history in France
Huguenot history in the United States
Cultural depictions of Louis XIV